Public Media Group of Southern California (PMGSC) is a non-profit broadcasting organization operating two TV stations and a non-commercial satellite television channel.

History
On April 25, 2018, KCETLink Media Group and the KOCE-TV Foundation announced that they would merge. KOCE would remain the primary PBS station for the market, while both stations continued to provide their existing programming services. The merger was completed on October 1, 2018, with the combined company named Public Media Group of Southern California. The boards of KCETLink and PBS SoCal sent 14 members to the Public Media Group board of directors with four new appointees. KCET Board Chairman Dick Cook was the board's initial chairman. SoCal's Andrew Russell would remain with the company as President and CEO.

References

External links

Television broadcasting companies of the United States
Non-profit organizations based in California
PBS member networks
2018 establishments in California